Cloud Nine is the ninth studio album by American musical group The Temptations for the Gordy (Motown) label released in 1969.

The album marked a major turning point in the group's career. It is the first full Temptations studio LP to feature Dennis Edwards as the replacement for David Ruffin, who was fired in June 1968. It also marked the beginning of the Temptations' delve into psychedelic soul under the ambitious direction of producer Norman Whitfield. The change in style polarized longtime fans but proved highly successful, with the album rising to number four on the Billboard Pop Albums Chart. It earned the group their first Grammy Award in 1969.

Background
Norman Whitfield took the Temptations into psychedelic territory after a suggestion from the group's de facto leader, Otis Williams. Williams had been discussing Sly & the Family Stone's music, and the changes it brought to the soul music industry, with his friend, producer Kenneth Gamble. Gamble agreed with Williams that Sly Stone's funkier production style and multi-lead vocals was here to stay and that it was time to learn to adapt to it.

While Williams, Whitfield, and Williams' then-wife Ann Cain were standing outside of the Casino Royale nightclub in Motown's home city of Detroit during the summer of 1968, Williams suggested that Whitfield might try to produce something like Sly & the Family Stone's "Dance to the Music" for their next single. The Temptations had been successful with romantic ballads such as "My Girl" and mid-tempo numbers such as "(I Know) I'm Losing You", but Williams, taking Gamble's advice, felt that it was time to update the group's sound. "Man, I don't want to be bothered with that shit," remarked Whitfield, who regarded the Family Stone sound as a "passing fancy".

Overview
Regardless of his original opinion of Sly Stone's work, by the fall of 1968, Whitfield had the Temptations recording "Cloud Nine", which featured all five members (Otis Williams, the newly drafted Dennis Edwards, and founding members Eddie Kendricks, Paul Williams, and Melvin Franklin) trading lead vocals over a Family Stone-like instrumental track. Although Otis Williams denies the connection, "Cloud Nine's" lyrics have frequently been cited as empathizing with drug use. The song seems to suggest that the best way for someone to deal with the problems that come with being poor and black in America was to "ride high on 'cloud nine'". "Cloud Nine" was a number six hit on the US pop singles chart, and a number two hit on the US R&B singles chart, and won Motown Records its first Grammy Award, for Best Rhythm & Blues Group Performance, Vocal or Instrumental.

The album's second single, "Run Away Child, Running Wild", delved further into unusual territory for the Temptations, turning a story about a lost runaway into a nine-minute epic of doo-wop vocals, droning organ lines, and hard-hitting drums similar to those typically heard in Sly & the Family Stone and James Brown records. Halfway through its running time, "Run Away Child" segues into an instrumental jam session (the single mix only includes the vocal half of the song). Future Temptations songs produced by Norman Whitfield, such as "Hum Along and Dance", "Smiling Faces Sometimes", and "Papa Was a Rollin' Stone", would further emphasize extended instrumental passages, often allowing said passages to overshadow the songs' vocals and as a result, The Temptations had him replaced by Jeffrey Bowen after the 1990 album.

"Run Away Child" was a number-one hit on the US R&B singles chart, and, like "Cloud Nine", a number six hit on the US pop chart. Earl Van Dyke, who performs the prominent organ solo during the instrumental section of the record, recorded his own instrumental version of "Run Away Child, Running Wild", which was released as a single the same year.

The rest of the Cloud Nine album is made up of more standard Temptations fare, most of which is relegated to the flip side of the LP. "Why Did She Have to Leave Me (Why Did She Have to Go)" features Dennis Edwards delivering a Ruffinesque lead on a slow ballad, and the Eddie Kendricks-led "I Need Your Lovin'" also finds the group in familiar surroundings. Edwards, Kendricks, and Melvin Franklin share the lead on "Love is a Hurtin' Thing", while "I Gotta Find a Way (To Get You Back)" is a showcase for Edwards alone. Paul Williams is given two solo numbers, "Hey Girl" and "Don't Let Him Take Your Love From Me", re-recorded as an upbeat single for The Four Tops the same year. The ballad "Gonna Keep on Tryin' Till I Win Your Love", led by Edwards, would later be re-recorded by the group in 1971 for the Sky's the Limit LP, with Kendricks on lead.

The one song that does not fit into either the ballads classification or the psychedelic soul classification is the Temptations' cover of the Gladys Knight & the Pips version of "I Heard It Through the Grapevine". Stripped to its rhythm track, the Temptation's version of "Grapevine" retains the tempo of Knight's hit version, but uses a less gospel based and more pop/blues based vocal arrangement.

After receiving positive critical reception for his new production style, and winning the Temptations a Grammy with "Cloud Nine", Whitfield would take the Temptations even further away from "My Girl" and onwards towards trippier singles such as "Don't Let the Joneses Get You Down", the #1 hit "I Can't Get Next to You", "Psychedelic Shack", and "Ball of Confusion (That's What the World Is Today)".

Track listing

Unreleased track
"Dinah" (Smokey Robinson, Al Cleveland) (lead singer: Eddie Kendricks) - produced by Smokey Robinson - subsequently released on Lost and Found: You've Got to Earn It (1962–1968).

Personnel 
The Temptations
Dennis Edwards – vocals (tenor)
Eddie Kendricks – vocals (tenor/falsetto)
Paul Williams – vocals (tenor/baritone)
Melvin Franklin – vocals (bass)
Otis Williams – vocals (tenor/baritone)

Singles history
"Cloud Nine"
Gordy single 7081, October 25, 1968; b-side: "Why Did She Have to Leave Me (Why Did She Have to Go)"
1969 Grammy Award Winner: Best Rhythm & Blues Group Performance, Vocal or Instrumental
"Run Away Child, Running Wild"
Gordy single 7084, January 30, 1969; b-side: "I Need Your Lovin'"

Charts

Weekly charts

Singles

Certifications

References

 Williams, Otis and Romanowski, Patricia (1988, updated 2002). Temptations. Lanham, MD: Cooper Square. .

1969 albums
The Temptations albums
Gordy Records albums
Albums produced by Norman Whitfield
Albums recorded at Hitsville U.S.A.